Saint-Isidore is a parish municipality in Roussillon Regional County Municipality in the Montérégie administrative region of Quebec, Canada. The population as of the Canada 2011 Census was 2,581. It is the hometown of mixed martial arts champion Georges St-Pierre.

Demographics 

Notable people
 Georges St-Pierre, mixed martial artist

See also
 Roussillon Regional County Municipality
 Chateauguay River
 Noire River (rivière de l'Esturgeon)
 Saint-Regis River
 List of parish municipalities in Quebec

References

External links
 

Parish municipalities in Quebec
Incorporated places in Roussillon Regional County Municipality
Greater Montreal